Kurong Anai was a state constituency in Perlis, Malaysia, that was represented in the Perlis State Legislative Assembly from 1959 to 1995.

The state constituency was created in the 1958 redistribution and was mandated to return a single member to the Perlis State Legislative Assembly under the first past the post voting system.

History
It was abolished in 1995 when it was redistributed.

Representation history

Election results

References

Defunct Perlis state constituencies